Ravesht-e Kuchek (also Romanized as Ravesht-e Kūchek) is a village in Benajuy-ye Shomali Rural District, in the Central District of Bonab County, East Azerbaijan Province, Iran. At the 2006 census, its population was 1,492, in 346 families.

References 

Populated places in Bonab County